The Putnam Bridge is a bridge in the state of Connecticut carrying the Route 3 Expressway over the Connecticut River, connecting Interstate 91 in Wethersfield and Route 2 in Glastonbury. It is the southernmost crossing of the Connecticut River in the Hartford Area and carries an average of 50,800 vehicles per day.

The bridge was built in the late 1950s as part of the Route 3 connector between Interstate 91 and Connecticut Route 2. It originally terminated at Main Street in Glastonbury, rather than at Route 2.  It was expected to be expanded to a double-decker in the early 1970s as part of the planned Interstate 491, a  southeastern bypass around Hartford from Wethersfield to East Hartford. However, the project was cancelled in 1973.  In the late 1980s, the expressway portion of Route 3 was extended to terminate at Route 2.

In 2013, the bridge underwent a $15 million rehabilitation project, which repaved the roadbed, repainted the girders, added new lighting fixtures and a new pedestrian walkway.

See also 
List of crossings of the Connecticut River

References

External links 

 

Glastonbury, Connecticut
Wethersfield, Connecticut
Bridges over the Connecticut River
Bridges in Hartford County, Connecticut
Road bridges in Connecticut
Steel bridges in the United States
Girder bridges in the United States
1950s establishments in Connecticut
Bridges completed in the 20th century